Abraham Pihl (3 October 1756 – 20 May 1821) was a Norwegian clergyman, astronomer, and architect.

Biography
Abraham Pihl was born in Gausdal, in Oppland county, Norway. He completed priest study at the University of Copenhagen in 1783 where he had also studied mathematics, mechanics and astronomy.

In 1784, Pihl became vicar at Flekkefjord in the county of Vest-Agder. From 1785 he was appointed as Denmark-Norway astronomical observer in Norway. In 1789, he was appointed to serve as priest in the parish of Vang in Hedmark (Vang kirke, Hamar) where he would serve until his death in 1821. When Vang church burned down in 1804, Pihl designed the new church and oversaw construction work. The church has an octagonal shape and is with 1000 seats the second largest of Norway's octagonal churches. The building later served as a model for octagonal churches the western side of Mjøsa.

Pihl developed a large collection of self-made astronomical instruments, and also made telescopes and sextants for others.  He designed Vang church which had burned down and was rebuilt between 1804 and 1810. He started large-scale production of pendulum clocks. The rectory became the largest employer in Vang, with up to 140 persons employed. His interest in practical matters categorized him as a so-called "potato priest".

Honors
He was decorated Knight of the Order of Dannebrog in 1809 for his scientific efforts.

Personal life
His father Andreas Pihl (1726–1781) was vicar of Gausdal. His grandfather Joachim Pihl (1689–1762) was provost for Gudbrandsdalen. In 1784, he married Anna Cathrine Neumann (1764–1850), daughter of Jacob Neumann, who operated the Hassel Iron Works in Modum. They were the parents of eight children and were the grandparents of engineers Oluf Pihl and Carl Abraham Pihl.

References

Other sources
Imerslund, Knut (2010) Abraham Pihl - prest, prost og tusenkunstner (Oplandske Bokforlag)

External links
Vang kirke, Hamar

1756 births
1821 deaths
People from Gausdal
19th-century Norwegian Lutheran clergy
Norwegian astronomers
18th-century Norwegian architects
University of Copenhagen alumni
Knights of the Order of the Dannebrog
18th-century Norwegian Lutheran clergy
19th-century Norwegian architects
Norwegian ecclesiastical architects